Come to Papa is an American sitcom that aired from June 3 until June 24, 2004.

Premise
An aspiring comedy writer works as a reporter for a large newspaper in New Jersey.

Cast
 Tom Papa as Tom Papa
 Jennifer Aspen as Karen
 Steve Carell as Blevin
 Robert Patrick Benedict as Judah
 John Salley as Mailman
 Jayden Lund as Mark

Episodes
Every episode was written by Greg Malins and Tom Papa and directed by Andy Ackerman.

References

External links

2004 American television series debuts
2004 American television series endings
2000s American sitcoms
English-language television shows
NBC original programming
Television shows set in New Jersey
Television series by Universal Television
Television series by Warner Bros. Television Studios
Latino sitcoms